Liu Wenxi (Chinese: 刘文锡; Pinyin: Liú Wénxī; born 5 May 1995 in Guangzhou) is a Chinese football player.

Club career
Liu played futsal in Panyu Pearl after he graduated from Guangzhou No.87 Middle School in 2011. He joined Chinese Super League side Shanghai Shenxin youth team system in early 2013 and was promoted to the first team in June 2013. On 6 July 2013, he made his Super League debut in a 3–0 home defeat against his hometown club Guangzhou Evergrande. He played four league matches and one FA match in the 2013 season. Liu failed to establish himself within the team after manager Zhu Jiong left the club. He was released at the end of 2014 season.

Club career statistics 
Statistics accurate as of match played 12 November 2014.

References

1995 births
Living people
Chinese footballers
Footballers from Guangzhou
Shanghai Shenxin F.C. players
Chinese Super League players
Association football midfielders
21st-century Chinese people